Mohammed Abul Bashar Shaikh (born 25 December 1986) is a Bangladeshi first-class cricketer. He is a right handed batsman and a right arm medium fast bowler. He represented Barisal Division cricket team in National Cricket League from 2004 to 2010. He also represented Dhaka Division cricket team in 2011-12 National Cricket League. He made his first-class debut for Barisal Division on March 4, 2005, and List A debut for Barisal Division on February 12, 2005.

References

External links 

1986 births
Living people
Bangladeshi cricketers